Brigadier-General Robert Murray (7 January 1689 – 25 March 1738) was a Scottish soldier and Member of Parliament, the third son of Charles Murray, 1st Earl of Dunmore and younger brother of John Murray, 2nd Earl of Dunmore.

Background
After service with the 3rd Regiment of Foot Guards, he was colonel of the 37th Regiment of Foot from 1722 to 1735 and of the 38th Regiment of Foot from 1735 to his death. He was ultimately promoted Brigadier-General in 1735. He was MP for Wootton Bassett from 1722 to 1727 and for Great Bedwyn from 1734 to 1738. He died in March 1738 aged 49.

|-

References
 R. S. Lea, MURRAY, Hon. Robert (1689-1738), of Stanwell, Mdx. in The History of Parliament: the House of Commons 1715-1754 (1970).

1689 births
1738 deaths
Younger sons of earls
British Army generals
Scots Guards officers
37th Regiment of Foot officers
South Staffordshire Regiment officers
British MPs 1722–1727
British MPs 1734–1741
Members of the Parliament of Great Britain for Great Bedwyn
Members of the Parliament of Great Britain for Wootton Bassett